These are the official results of the men's 200 metres event at the 1983 IAAF World Championships in Helsinki, Finland. There were a total number of 57 participating athletes, with eight qualifying heats and the final held on 14 August 1983.

At 22 years, 218 days old, gold medallist Smith was the youngest ever world champion for the men's 200 metres until 2019, when Noah Lyles, aged 22 years and 75 days, won the 2019 title.

Records
Existing records at the start of the event.

Results

Qualifying heats
The qualifying heats took place on 12 August, with the 57 athletes involved being splitted into 8 heats. The first 3 athletes in each heat ( Q ) and the next 8 fastest ( q ) qualified for the quarter-finals. 

Heat 1 (wind +1.8 m/s)

Heat 2 (wind +1.8 m/s)

Heat 3 (wind +0.7 m/s)

Heat 4 (wind +1.1 m/s)

Heat 5 (wind –2.1 m/s)

Heat 6 (wind +0.4 m/s)

Heat 7 (wind –1.1 m/s)

Heat 8 (wind +1.3 m/s)

Quarterfinals
The qualifying heats took place on 12 August, with the 32 athletes involved being splitted into 4 heats. The first 4 athletes in each heat ( Q ) qualified for the semifinals. 

Heat 1 (wind +2.1 m/s)

Heat 2 (wind –1.6 m/s)

Heat 3 (wind –0.4 m/s)

Heat 4 (wind +1.6 m/s)

Semifinals
The semifinals took place on 13 August, with the 16 athletes involved being splitted into 2 heats. The first 4 athletes in each heat ( Q ) qualified for the final. 

Heat 1 (wind +3.4 m/s)

Heat 2 (wind +1.4 m/s)

Final
The final took place on August 14.
Wind: +1.2 m/s

References
 Results

200 metres at the World Athletics Championships
Events at the 1983 World Championships in Athletics